Tankville is a neighbourhood in the city of Moncton. Tankville was officially amalgamated with Moncton in 1973.

History
See History of Moncton and Timeline of Moncton history

Places of note

Bordering communities

References

Neighbourhoods in Moncton